The Abbey of Saint-Georges, Boscherville, is a former Benedictine abbey located in the commune of Saint-Martin-de-Boscherville, in Seine-Maritime, France. It was founded in about 1113 on the site of an earlier establishment of secular canons and settled by monks from the Abbey of Saint-Evroul.

References

External links
 Abbaye Saint-Georges

Benedictine monasteries in France
Buildings and structures in Seine-Maritime
Churches in Seine-Maritime
Tourist attractions in Seine-Maritime
Gardens in Seine-Maritime
Romanesque architecture in Normandy
Christian monasteries established in the 12th century
1113 establishments in Europe
1110s establishments in France